The Erzherzog Karl class was a class of pre-dreadnought battleships of the Austro-Hungarian Navy built before World War I. All of the battleships of the Erzherzog Karl-class were built in the Stabilimento Tecnico Triestino shipyards in Trieste. The first battleship,  was laid down in 1902. Construction on the remaining two battleships,  and  continued up to 1905. Erzherzog Karl was commissioned in 1906, while Erzherzog Ferdinand Max and Erzherzog Friedrich were commissioned in 1907. The three Erzherzog Karl-class battleships were considered relatively modern by the time they were commissioned. However, small docking space and budget restraints resulted in the class being fairly compact. Nevertheless, they were well designed and properly protected. The Erzherzog Karl class were the last and largest pre-dreadnoughts built by the Austrian Navy. They were named after members of the Austrian Royal family.

Despite these qualities, the Erzherzog Karl-class battleships were inferior to the more modern Dreadnought type battleships – with their "all big gun" armament and turbine propulsion. As a result, they only played a limited role during World War I.  At the beginning of the war, the members of the Erzherzog Karl class formed the III division of the Austrian-Hungarian battle-fleet.

The ships also took part in suppressing a major mutiny among the crew members of several armored cruisers stationed in Cattaro between 1–3 February 1918. Following Austria-Hungary's defeat in World War I, Erzherzog Karl and Erzherzog Friedrich were handed over to France. The remaining battleship, Erzherzog Ferdinand Max, was given to Great Britain. Erzherzog Karl ran aground at Bizerte and was broken up there in 1921. The remaining two battleships were scrapped in 1921 in Italy.

Design

General characteristics 

The Erzherzog Karl class displaced . They were manned by 700 men.

Propulsion 

The ships were propelled by two two-shaft, four cylinder vertical triple expansion steam engines. On trials, Erzherzog Karls engines managed to produce a knot more speed than was originally planned.

Armament 
The Erzherzog Karl class carried a primary armament made by Škoda Works. On each ship, there were four /40 caliber guns in two twin turrets on the centerline. These guns were an Austro-Hungarian replica of the 24 cm/40 (9.4") Krupp C/94, which was used on the Habsburgs. The guns could be depressed to −5° and elevated to 30°. The arc of fire of the guns was 300°, or 150° in each direction. Each gun required a crew of twenty men. At maximum elevation, the gun could fire a  shell . Each of the guns weighed at least .

Their secondary armament consisted of twelve /42 caliber guns, also made by Škoda, mounted in eight single casemates on either wing of the ship and two single midships turrets on the either wing of the ship. They could be depressed to −3° and elevated to 20°. The gun weighed 12.1 tons and could fire three rounds per minute.

The ships had a tertiary armament for protection against torpedo boats in the form of the /45 caliber gun, too manufactured by Škoda. They could be depressed to −10° and elevated to 20, and had an arc of fire of 360°, meaning that they could fire at any target within their range of fire. The guns could fire about ten to fifteen rounds per minute.

Anti-aircraft and airship protection was covered by the four  Vickers anti-aircraft guns on the ship. They could be depressed to −5° and elevated to 80°. They had an arc of fire of 360°, which meant that they also could engage any target within their range. After 1916-17 refits two Škoda 7 cm L/45 guns on anti-aircraft mounts were installed. The Erzherzog Karl class was also fitted with two above water  torpedo tubes, although they were rarely used.

Armor 

The turrets and casemates had  and  armor respectively. This was done in order to protect the battleships against a possible shell landing on the turrets and the imminent explosion resulting from such a hit.

Construction 

The Erzherzog Karl class, like the Habsburg class before them and the Radetzky class after them were named after archdukes of the Austro-Hungarian Royal Family, specifically Archduke Charles, Duke of Teschen, Maximilian I of Mexico and Archduke Friedrich, Duke of Teschen. The ships were all laid down at the Stabilimento Tecnico Triestino in Trieste. The first ship of the class,  was laid down on 24 July 1902. Following 15 months of construction she was launched on 4 October 1903 and finally commissioned into the Austro-Hungarian Navy on 17 June 1906. She was laid down on 4 October 1902 and launched on 30 April 1904. Erzherzog Friedrich was finally commissioned into the Austro-Hungarian Navy on 31 January 1907. She was laid down on 9 March 1904 and later launched on 21 May 1905. She was commissioned into the navy on 21 December 1907.

Ships

Service history 

At the outbreak of World War I the three ships formed the III division of the Austrian-Hungarian battle-fleet and spent most of the war based at Pola. The two German ships were attempting to break out of Messina, being chased by the French Navy and the Royal Navy, and make their way to Turkey. The breakout succeeded. When the flotilla had advanced as far south as Brindisi in south eastern Italy, the Austro-Hungarian ships were recalled. In company with other units of the Austro Hungarian Navy the class took part in the bombardment of Ancona on May 24, 1915. There they expended 24 rounds of 240 mm armor-piercing shells at signal and semaphore stations as well as 74 rounds of 190 mm shells aimed at Italian gun-batteries and other port installations.

Two days later, the three Erzherzog Karl-class ships arrived in the port and assisted with the suppression of the mutiny. Following the restoration of order in the naval base, the armored cruisers Sankt Georg and Kaiser Karl VI were decommissioned and the three Erzherzog Karl-class battleships were stationed in Cattaro in their place.

For the morning of 11 June, Admiral Miklós Horthy planned a major assault on the Otranto Barrage; the three Erzherzog Karls and the four s were to provide support for the s. The plan was intended to replicate the success of the raid conducted one year earlier. Horthy's plan was to destroy the blockading fleet by luring Allied ships to the cruisers and lighter ships, which were protected from the heavier guns of the battleships, including the Erzherzog Karl class. However, on the morning of 10 June, the dreadnought  was torpedoed and sunk by an Italian torpedo boat. Horthy felt surprise had been lost and therefore called off the operation. This was to be the last military action the Erzherzog Karl-class ships were to take part in and they spent the rest of their career at port in Pola.

Following the end of World War I in November 1918, the members of the Erzherzog Karl class were first taken over by Yugoslavia in 1919, but Erzherzog Karl and Erzherzog Friedrich were then ceded as war reparations to France. The remaining battleship, Erzherzog Ferdinand Max, was ceded to the United Kingdom. However, Erzherzog Karl ran aground at Bizerte on her voyage to Toulon and was eventually broken up in situ. The remaining two battleships were scrapped in 1921.

See also 

Austro-Hungarian Navy

References 

Citations

Bibliography

 

Battleship classes
Erzherzog Karl class battleship